Beer nuts is a snack food of roasted, salted peanuts sold shelled but unhusked and not sweetened. Both generic and branded beer nuts exist and one famous Australian brand is Nobby's.

In the United States, Beer Nuts is a brand of sweet and salty glazed peanuts.

See also
 List of peanut dishes

Peanut dishes
Australian cuisine